Lee Marshall may refer to:
Lee Marshall (announcer) (1949–2014), professional wrestling announcer
Lee Marshall (footballer, born 1979), English football player
Lee Marshall (footballer, born 1997), English football player for Swindon Town
M. Lee Marshall, chairman of Continental Baking Company from 1934 to 1944